Angela Romei (born February 20, 1997) is an Italian curler from Pinerolo. She currently plays second on the Italian National Women's Curling Team skipped by Stefania Constantini.

Personal life
As of 2020, Romei is a student.

References

External links

1997 births
Living people
Italian female curlers
People from Monopoli
People from Pinerolo
Competitors at the 2019 Winter Universiade
Sportspeople from the Metropolitan City of Bari
Sportspeople from the Metropolitan City of Turin
21st-century Italian women